Anton Ortmann (19 March 1801, in Plan – 21 November 1861, in Elbogen) was a Bohemian-Austrian pharmacist and botanist, known for his investigations of flora native to Bohemia, notably in the environs of Karlsbad and Elbogen.

During his career, he worked as a pharmacist in Karlsbad and later Elbogen (since 1842). From 1857 to 1861 he served as mayor of Elbogen. The plant genus Ortmannia (family Orchidaceae) was named in honor by Philipp Maximilian Opiz.

Publications 
 Beobachtungen über einige Pflanzen, welche in der Umgebung von Karlsbad oder in Böhmen überhaupt vorkommen, in: Allgemeine Botanische Zeitung 18, (1835).
 Flora Carlsbadensis, in: L. Fleckle, Karlsbad, (1838).
 Flora des Elbogner Kreises im Königreich Böhmen, (1842) – Flora of the Elbogen circle in the Kingdom of Bohemia.
 Die Flora von Karlsbad, in: Der Führer in Karlsbad und der Umgegend, (5th edition, 1850) – The flora of Karlsbad.

References 

1801 births
1861 deaths
People from České Budějovice District
19th-century Austrian botanists
Czech botanists
Czech pharmacists